Bertha Leticia Navarro Ochoa (born November 10, 1953 in Colima, Colima) is a Mexican entrepreneur who served as Secretary of Tourism in the cabinet of President Vicente Fox.

Navarro holds a bachelor's degree in administration from the National Autonomous University of Mexico (UNAM) and has pursued graduate studies at the Simmons College in Boston, Massachusetts. She has occupied high ranking positions in the Gillette company and served as president of JAFRA Cosmetics.

On December 1, 2000 Vicente Fox designated her as Secretary of Tourism, and she served in that post until July 29, 2003. She was succeeded by Rodolfo Elizondo Torres.

References 

1953 births
Living people
Politicians from Colima City
Mexican Secretaries of Tourism
National Autonomous University of Mexico alumni
Simmons University alumni
Women Secretaries of State of Mexico
21st-century Mexican politicians
21st-century Mexican women politicians